Metropolitan Philip (Saliba) (born Abdullah Saliba;  Abou Mizan, Lebanon Fort Lauderdale, Florida) was the Archbishop of New York, Metropolitan of All North America, and primate of the Antiochian Orthodox Christian Archdiocese of North America. His tenure as an Orthodox bishop was the longest serving in American history.

Education
Saliba was educated at Balamand Orthodox Theological Seminary in Lebanon and at schools in Syria. He later studied in England at the Anglican Kelham Theological College and the University of London. After moving to the United States he studied at Holy Cross Greek Orthodox School of Theology and at Wayne State University, where, in 1958, he received a Bachelor of Arts degree in history.

On , Saliba was ordained to the priesthood by Metropolitan Anthony (Bashir) and assigned to the pastorate at St. George Church in Cleveland, Ohio.

In , the Antiochian Archdiocese, meeting in special convention, nominated Saliba to succeed the late Metropolitan Anthony (Bashir) as Archbishop of New York and Metropolitan of all North America. In , the Patriarchal Vicar for the widowed See of New York, Metropolitan Ilyas (Kurban), Archbishop of Tripoli, elevated Saliba to the dignity of archimandrite.

In 1977, the two Antiochian Jurisdictions in North America merged. Metropolitan Philip was chosen to lead them.

Twenty years after the radical nineteen-sixties, the Jesus People were losing steam and some of them had begun pursuing New Testament Christianity, forming the Evangelical Orthodox Church. After studying the ancient Church through to the time of the East-West Schism, contact was made with the Greek Archdiocese and the Orthodox Church in America. The EOC leaders, led by Fr. Peter E. Gillquist, approached Metropolitan Philip. After an extended process, Metropolitan Philip brought 17 Evangelical Orthodox Parishes into the Antiochian Orthodox Christian Archdiocese of North America.

In 1966, Metropolitan Philip expressed his hope that, within 25 years, i.e., by 1991, the Orthodox jurisdictions in the United States would be united administratively. As of 2022, 56 years later, that vision has yet to be realized as they are still "unfortunately divided by nationalistic barriers."

Works

See also 

 Greek Orthodox Patriarchate of Antioch
 Antiochian Greek Christians
 Antiochian Orthodox Christian Archdiocese of North America
 Assembly of Canonical Orthodox Bishops of the United States of America

References

Further reading

External links
 

1931 births
2014 deaths
20th-century Eastern Orthodox archbishops
21st-century Eastern Orthodox archbishops
Antiochian Orthodox Metropolitans of All North America
Eastern Orthodox bishops in the United States
Eastern Orthodox metropolitans
Lebanese Christians
Wayne State University alumni